EPR Properties, formerly Entertainment Properties Trust, is a real estate investment trust based in Kansas City, Missouri, that invests in amusement parks, movie theaters, ski resorts, and other entertainment properties. It owns 353 properties as of 2022.

History
Entertainment Properties Trust was created by AMC Entertainment executive Peter Brown and financial analyst David Brain. They decided to establish a REIT focused on megaplex movie theaters after failing to find an existing REIT to help finance AMC's development of theaters. The company was incorporated on August 22, 1997. It held its initial public offering in November 1997, raising $278 million. By March 1998, Entertainment Properties had purchased 13 AMC theaters in sale-and-leaseback transactions.

In 2005, the company established VinREIT, a subsidiary focused on vineyard properties. It purchased a portfolio of six vineyards and wineries from Constellation Brands in 2008 for $115 million. By 2010, the company was "evaluating" VinREIT after a downturn in the wine industry, and in 2011, all of the wine properties were put up for sale. The sales were completed by 2014.

Entertainment Properties Trust began investing in charter school properties in 2007, primarily through a deal with Imagine Schools. By 2012, the company owned 41 schools.

The company changed its name to EPR Properties in 2012 to reflect its diversification into recreation and education properties.

In 2015, Brain retired as chief executive officer.

In 2017, EPR bought a portfolio of properties from CNL Financial Group for $456 million, comprising the Northstar California ski resort, 15 waterparks and amusement parks, and 5 small family entertainment centers.

In November 2019, the company sold its portfolio of charter schools for $454 million.

Properties
As of 2022, the company owns 353 properties, including 175 movie theaters, 74 education properties, 56 eat-and-play properties, 18 amusement parks and water parks, 11 ski resorts, and 8 hotels.

Notable properties are listed below.

Amusement parks and water parks
 Camelbeach Waterpark — Tannersville, Pennsylvania
 Frontier City — Oklahoma City, Oklahoma
 Hawaiian Falls Garland — Garland, Texas
 Hawaiian Falls The Colony — The Colony, Texas
 Magic Springs — Hot Springs, Arkansas
 Pacific Park — Santa Monica, California
 Rapids Water Park — Riviera Beach, Florida
 Six Flags Darien Lake — Darien, New York
 Six Flags Hurricane Harbor Concord — Concord, California
 Six Flags Hurricane Harbor Oklahoma City — Oklahoma City, Oklahoma
 Six Flags Hurricane Harbor Phoenix — Glendale, Arizona
 Six Flags Hurricane Harbor SplashTown — Spring, Texas
 Wet'n'Wild Hawaii — Kapolei, Hawaii
 Wild Waves Theme Park — Federal Way, Washington

Eat-and-play properties
 Entertainment Centrum — 4 locations in Ontario
 New Roc City — New Rochelle, New York
 Ninkasi Brewing Tasting Room — Eugene, Oregon
 Topgolf — 36 locations

Ski resorts
 Alpine Valley Ski Area
 Alyeska Resort
 Boston Mills/Brandywine Ski Resort
 Camelback Mountain Resort
 Hunter Mountain
 Jack Frost Ski Resort / Big Boulder Mountain
 Mad River Mountain
 Mount Snow
 Northstar California
 Village Vacances Valcartier

Museums
 City Museum — St. Louis, Missouri
 Titanic Museum — Branson, Missouri
 Titanic Museum — Pigeon Forge, Tennessee

References

External links
 
 

Financial services companies established in 1997
Real estate investment trusts of the United States
Companies listed on the New York Stock Exchange
Companies based in Kansas City, Missouri
1997 initial public offerings